The 1930 Cal Aggies football team represented the Northern Branch of the College of Agriculture—now known as the University of California, Davis—as a member of the Far Western Conference (FWC) during the 1930 college football season. Led by third-year head coach Crip Toomey, the Aggies compiled an overall record of 0–7–1 with a mark of 0–3–1 in conference play, tying for fifth place in the FWC. The team was outscored by its opponents 134 to 17 for the season. They were shut out in their first five games and did not score more than a touchdown in any game. The Cal Aggies played home games at Sacramento Stadium in Sacramento, California.

Schedule

Notes

References

Cal Aggies
UC Davis Aggies football seasons
College football winless seasons
Cal Aggies football